Benedito Lyra (born May 1, 1941) is a Brazilian politician from Alagoas, member of Progressistas (PP), former Senator for his state and incumbent Mayor of Barra de São Miguel.

Biography
Lira is Bachelor of Laws by the Federal University of Alagoas (UFAL). He began his political career as City Councillor in his hometown between 1966 and 1970, and later as City Councillor of Maceió for two consecutive terms, between 1973 and 1982. He was State Deputy from 1983 to 1994.

In 2002, Lira was elected Federal Deputy for the Brazilian Labour Party (PTB), and re-elected in 2006 for the Progressive Party (PP).

In 2010, he was elected Senator with 904,345 votes, representing 35.94% of the valid votes.

In December 2016, he voted in favor of the Constitutional Amendment to limit public expenses (PEC 241). In July 2017, voted to approve the new Labour Reform.

In October 2017, voted to maintain Senator Aécio Neves (PSDB-MG) in office, suspending the effects of the decision of the First Group of the Supreme Federal Court, in an investigation which he is accused of corruption and obstruction of justice after asking for R$ 2 million (US$  in 2017) to businessman Joesley Batista.

Controversies

Ambulances mafia
Benedito de Lira was one of the involved in the scandal of overpriced ambulances, also known as "leeches".

Corruption in Petrobras

Benedito de Lira, and his son Arthur Lira, are investigated by the Federal Police in the scheme of corruption in the state oil company Petrobras. The Police found evidences of passive corruption after the conclusion of iopen inquiries to investigate the participation of Benedito and Arthur Lira. According to the report, Arthur and Benedito "benefited with the receivement of undue periodic amounts, from the payment of bribes by companies which had contracts with Petrobras, due to the control of the Progressive Party of the Directory of Supplies, office held by Paulo Roberto Costa, in exchange for votes in projects of interest of the federal government".

In February 2016, Lira had his goods blocked by the Supreme Federal Court, in a decision ruled by Justice Teori Zavascki, in a total of R$1.6 million (US$ ) The request for the blocking was made by the Prosecutor General Rodrigo Janot, who was responsible for the investigation against federal parliamentaries in the operation.

References

External links
 
 
 

Living people
1942 births
Members of the Legislative Assembly of Alagoas
Members of the Chamber of Deputies (Brazil) from Alagoas
Members of the Federal Senate (Brazil)
Progressistas politicians